Brit Awards 1995  was the 15th edition of the Brit Awards, an annual pop music awards ceremony in the United Kingdom. It was organised by the British Phonographic Industry and took place on 20 February 1995 at Alexandra Palace in London. Blur won four awards, the most any artist gained in a single ceremony.

Performances
 Blur – "Girls & Boys"
 East 17 – "Let It Rain"
 Eddi Reader – "Patience of Angels"
 Elton John – "Believe", "Philadelphia Freedom" & "I'm Still Standing"
 Eternal – "Baby Love"
 Sting & M People – "Set Them Free"
 Madonna – "Bedtime Story"
 Take That – "Back for Good"

Winners and nominees

Outstanding Contribution to Music
 Elton John

References

External links
Brit Awards 1995 at Brits.co.uk

Brit Awards
Brit Awards
Brit Awards
Brit Awards
Brit
Brit Awards